8186 Live is the second live album by the Japanese band Loudness. It was recorded and released in Japan only in 1987 simultaneously in 3 formats; double vinyl LP with a 7-inch EP (3 disc set), double CD and double cassette tape.

Track listing

Personnel
Loudness
Minoru Niihara – vocals
Akira Takasaki – guitars
Masayoshi Yamashita – bass
Munetaka Higuchi – drums

Production
Masahiro Miyazawa - engineer
Masashi Goto - assistant engineer
Bill Freesh - mixing
George Azuma, Sam Nagashima - coordinators
Tokugen Yamamoto, Toshi Nakashita - executive producers

References

Loudness (band) live albums
1987 live albums
Atco Records live albums
Warner Music Group live albums